The Lidder or Liddar is a  river situated in the Kashmir Valley of Jammu and Kashmir, India.

Etymology
Lidder is a corruption of the local Sanskrit name Lambodari (लम्बोदरी) meaning 'long bellied goddess'.

Geography

Lidder river originates from Kolhoi Glacier near Sonamarg and gives rise to Lidder Valley. It runs southwards through the alpine meadows of Lidderwat in region of Aru, from which it got its name. It covers  before reaching Pahalgam where it the major tributary of East Lidder from Sheshnag Lake. It then runs westwards until it meets the Jehlum River at Mirgund Khanabal near Anantnag. It has crystal blueish water and Pahalgam is situated in the center of Lidder Valley.

Economy
The waters of the river are mainly used for irrigation purpose through different canals and drinking through water treatment plants. There are many different varieties of fishes present in the river and a fisheries plant has been built on the banks of the river. Major types of fishes found in Lidder River are Brown trout (Salmo trutta fario) and Rainbow trout (Oncorhynchus mykiss).

References

External links

Kashmir
Rivers of Jammu and Kashmir
Indus basin
Rivers of India